Londubh  is a village on the south shore of Loch Ewe in Poolewe, Ross-shire, Scottish Highlands and is in the Scottish council area of Highland. The village of Poolewe lies directly to the south along the A832 road.

References

Populated places in Ross and Cromarty